Walchsee is a municipality in the Austrian state of Tyrol in the Kufstein district. It is located in the lower Inn valley and belongs to the "Kaiserwinkl" and the "Untere Schranne".

Geography
Walchsee is located 18 km northeast of the city Kufstein, between the lake by the same name and the foot of the majestic Kaiser mountain range. Here is north Tyrol's largest preserved raised bog, the "Schwemm". The lake Walchsee has area of about 2,5 km² and its average summer temperature is 21°.

Borders
Walchsee has borders to two municipalities in the district of Kufstein (Ebbs, Rettenschöss) and three municipalities in the district of Kitzbühel (Kössen, Schwendt, Kirchdorf in Tirol). There is also a border to a German municipality called Aschau im Chiemgau, which belongs to the district of Rosenheim. The lowest point of Walchsee is located in Durchholzen (Schmiedtal 650 m) and the highest point is the Vordere Kesselschneid at 2,002 m.

Structure
Walchsee has 5 little districts: Durchholzen, Schwaigs, Oed, Winkl and Walchsee itself.

Images

Neighbouring villages
Aschau im Chiemgau (D), Ebbs, Kirchdorf in Tyrol, Kössen, Rettenschöss, Schwendt

Economy

Tourism
Resort facilities: 40 km of winter walking paths, 25 km of ski runs, 140 km of cross-country skiing tracks, sledding, skating  etc.

References

External links

 Walchsee water quality: Walchsee Water quality
 Walchsee statistik data:Statistik Austria

Kufstein District
Cities and towns in Kufstein District